Glenn Gustafsson (born 4 September 1998) is a Swedish professional ice hockey forward currently playing for Växjö Lakers of the Swedish Hockey League (SHL).

Personal life
Gustafsson's older brother Erik currently plays for the Washington Capitals organization.

References

External links
 

1998 births
Living people
Örebro HK players
Ice hockey people from Stockholm
Swedish ice hockey left wingers
Växjö Lakers players